Nizhniye Termy (Tübänge Tirmä) is a rural locality (a village) in Yeremeyevsky Selsoviet, Chishminsky District, Bashkortostan, Russia. The population was 331 as of 2010. There are 5 streets.

Geography 
Nizhniye Termy is located 10 km west of Chishmy (the district's administrative centre) by road. Verkhniye Termy is the nearest rural locality.

References 

Rural localities in Chishminsky District